Events in the year 1838 in Bolivia.

Incumbents
President: Andrés de Santa Cruz (also Supreme Protector of the Peru-Bolivian Confederation)

Events
January 12–13 - War of the Confederation: Battle of Islay
June 24 - War of the Confederation: Battle of Montenegro

Births
October 13 - Eduardo Abaroa

Deaths

 
1830s in Bolivia